The Occupy movement began in the United States initially with the Occupy Wall Street protests in New York City but spread to many other cities, both in the United States and worldwide. There have been hundreds of Occupy movement protests worldwide over time. This is a list of some of their locations in the United States. The state with the most protests is California, which has over fifty protest locations (see List of Occupy movement protest locations in California).

List

 Puerto Rico: Officially an unincorporated territory of the United States.

Gallery

See also 

 

 Timeline of Occupy Wall Street
 We are the 99%
Other U.S. protests
 2011 United States public employee protests
 2011 Wisconsin protests

 
Other international protests
 15 October 2011 global protests
 2010–2011 Greek protests
 2011 Chilean protests
 2011 Israeli social justice protests
 2011 United Kingdom anti-austerity protests and 2010 UK student protests
 Iceland Kitchenware Revolution
 Spanish 15M Indignants movement

 

Related articles
 Bank Transfer Day
 Corruption Perceptions Index
 Economic inequality
 Grassroots movement
 Impact of the Arab Spring
 Income inequality in the United States
 List of countries by distribution of wealth
 List of countries by income equality
 Plutocracy
 Wealth inequality in the United States

References

Protest locations
Occupy movement protest locations
Occupy movement protest locations in the United States
Occupy movement protest locations